Survivors is a British post-apocalyptic fiction drama television series created by Terry Nation and produced by Terence Dudley at the BBC, that broadcast from 1975 to 1977. It concerns the plight of a group of people who have survived an apocalyptic plague pandemic, which was accidentally released by a Chinese scientist and quickly spread across the world via air travel. Referred to as "The Death", the plague kills approximately 4,999 out of every 5,000 human beings on the planet within a matter of weeks of being released.

Production

History
The programme ran for three series and 38 episodes (series 1 and 2 comprised 13 episodes each, the third series just 12; budget cuts and technical problems reduced the planned last double episode to a single, as some scenes were lost during shooting). All series were broadcast on Wednesday evenings on BBC 1, from April 1975 to June 1977. Popular writer Terry Nation (whose work included many scripts for Doctor Who) created the series, but he left the show after the first series due to disputes with producer Terence Dudley.

The series' main actors included Carolyn Seymour (Abby), Lucy Fleming (Jenny), Ian McCulloch (Greg), and Denis Lill (Charles). The child actor Stephen Dudley (John) was given his part by his father, the show's producer Terence Dudley; while the child actress Tanya Ronder (who in series 1 and 2 played Lizzie) is the daughter of Jack Ronder, who wrote eight episodes of Survivors. In addition, the few appearances of Greg and Jenny's baby son Paul on Survivors saw Lucy Fleming's real-life son Diggory appear as Paul, although uncredited. Notable guest stars in the series included Patrick Troughton, Peter Jeffrey, Brian Blessed, George Baker, Philip Madoc, Bryan Pringle, Iain Cuthbertson, and Peter Bowles. Appearing in the series before becoming famous were Kevin McNally (Pirates of the Caribbean), Robert Fyfe (Last of the Summer Wine), Denis Lawson (Star Wars), David Neilson (Coronation Street), Peter Duncan (Blue Peter), June Brown (EastEnders), David Troughton, and Roger Lloyd-Pack (Only Fools and Horses and The Vicar of Dibley).

In a High Court case in the mid-1970s, which was abandoned by both sides due to escalating costs, writer Brian Clemens claimed that he had told Terry Nation the concept for the series in the late 1960s and had registered the idea with the Writers' Guild of Great Britain in 1965. Nation strenuously denied this.

A BBC Four documentary, entitled The Cult of... Survivors, featuring interviews with actors Lucy Fleming, Ian McCulloch, and Carolyn Seymour, director Pennant Roberts, and scriptwriter Martin Worth, was broadcast on 5 December 2006, as part of the channel's Science Fiction Britannia series.  The Cult of... series also included documentaries on Blake's 7 (another series devised by Terry Nation) and Doomwatch (produced by Terence Dudley).

Locations

The majority of the locations for all three series of Survivors were in the Welsh Marches, the counties of Monmouthshire, Shropshire, Powys, and, for the first two series, the characters most often seen in Herefordshire. The first episode of series 1 ("The Fourth Horseman") featured several locations in Worcestershire, including Great Malvern railway station. Much of episode 2, "Genesis", was filmed around the village of Rose, Cornwall. Later episodes had the characters move around Herefordshire, from places like Ross-on-Wye to Welsh Newton Common. Llanarth Court in Monmouthshire was also featured. Brockhampton Court near How Caple, Herefordshire was used as "Waterhouse" in the episode "Garland's War". Towards the end of the first series, the action moved to a more permanent base at Hampton Court, again in Herefordshire. (This was the property referred to as "The Grange" by the characters.)

For the beginning of series 2 the focus moved to a new location, at Callow Hill Farm, near Monmouth (but again just within Herefordshire), as "Whitecross". The Lights of London episodes featured Hanwell railway station, The Oval, and other locations in London, while the Waterloo & City line and the Camden Town deep-level shelter were used to represent parts of the London Underground. The Monmouthshire and Brecon Canal and village of Skenfrith also made appearances.

During series 3, production occasionally moved further afield to Suffolk, Derbyshire, and Wiltshire, with the last episode filmed in the Scottish Highlands. Extensive use was made of the Severn Valley Railway.

There are a great number of technical and continuity errors visible as the series was shot quickly on early video cameras, which did not work well in the gloomy conditions in which much of the programme was shot. Two cameras were used, but one of them had a recurrent fault, which shows as multiple reflections on the left hand side of pictures in many scenes, particularly visible in series 3. Primitive equipment meant that many shots suffered from a green tint. Due to audience complaints about this, the production crew replaced the cameras.

2008 version

In 2008, the BBC began airing a new version of Survivors, with Adrian Hodges as the main writer. In the credits, this version is said to be based on Terry Nation's novel Survivors (1976), rather than the previous series. This statement was made to avoid copyright problems, as the rights to the television series were vested with a different legal entity from the rights to the book.

The principal characters of Abby, Greg, Jenny and Tom Price were retained, but new elements were introduced, including a subplot about the origins of the virus and a stronger focus on action. The show took pains to make sure these characters represented a broader spread of racial and social backgrounds. The show received mixed reviews, but initial viewing figures were strong.

The 2008 series ran for two seasons, and the BBC announced in April 2010 that there would be no third series.

Audio drama version
In June 2014, Big Finish Productions released the first four-episode volume of an audio drama expansion of Survivors, with Seymour, McCulloch, and Fleming reprising their screen roles. The second and third volumes were released in 2015, and the fourth and fifth in 2016, with sixth and seventh volumes scheduled for 2017. On 21 December 2016, Big Finish announced an eighth and ninth volume to be released in 2018.

Series overview

Episodes

Series 1 (1975)
As the world's population is almost annihilated by a mysterious pandemic, accidentally unleashed by an unnamed Chinese scientist, the crisis is first seen through the eyes of two characters—Jenny Richards, a young working woman in London who is naturally immune to the disease, and Abby Grant, a middle-class corporate wife living a comfortable existence in a suburban commuter village who caught the virus but barely recovered, while her husband died. As Abby goes in search of her son Peter, who was away at boarding school when the pandemic occurred, Jenny wanders aimlessly through the countryside.

Other major characters introduced in the first few episodes are the resourceful engineer Greg Preston, the shifty Welshman Tom Price, and two children, John Millon and Lizzie Willoughby. Abby, Jenny, and Greg eventually come together and realise they must start again from scratch now that the civilisation they once knew has been destroyed. After several adventures on the road, they find a property called The Grange which they can use as a base and, joined by other survivors, they form a potted community of disparate individuals all united by a shared purpose; to relearn the old skills of farming and tool-making, and to try to live in this new world.

Regular cast

 Carolyn Seymour as Abby Grant (eps. 1-13)
 Ian McCulloch as Greg Preston (eps. 2-13)
 Lucy Fleming as Jenny Richards (eps. 1-13)
 Talfryn Thomas as Tom Price (eps. 1-3, 7-10)
 Tanya Ronder as Lizzie Willoughby (eps. 5-13)
 Stephen Dudley as John Millon (eps. 5-13)
 Hana-Maria Pravda as Emma Cohen (eps. 7-13)
 Julie Neubert as Wendy (eps. 7-9)
 John Hallett as Barney (eps. 7-9)
 Chris Tranchell as Paul Pitman (eps. 8-13)
 Terry Scully as Vic Thatcher (eps. 2, 8-10)
 Hugh Walters as Vic Thatcher (eps. 11, 13)
 Michael Gover as Arthur Russell (eps. 8-13)
 Eileen Helsby as Charmian Wentworth (eps. 8-13)
 Myra Frances as Anne Tranter (eps. 2, 11)
 Richard Heffer as Jimmy Garland (eps. 6, 13)

Guest cast

 Peter Bowles as David Grant (ep. 1)
 Peter Copley as Dr. Bronson (ep. 1)
 Christopher Reich as Dr. Andrew Tyler (ep. 1)
 Margaret Anderson as Mrs. Transon (ep. 1)
 Callum Mill as Dr. Gordon (ep. 1)
 Blake Butler as Mr. Pollard (ep. 1)
 Elizabeth Sinclair as Patricia (ep. 1)
 Giles Melville as Kevin Lloyd (ep. 1)
 Len Jones as First Youth (ep. 1)
 Brian Peck as Dave Long (eps. 2-3)
 George Baker as Arthur Wormley (ep. 2)
 Edward Brooks as Colonel (ep. 2)
 Peter Jolley as First Man (ep. 2)
 Barry Stanton as Reg Gunnel (ep. 3)
 Robert Gillespie as John Milner (ep. 3)
 Robert Fyfe as Phillipson (ep. 3)
 Graham Fletcher as Boy (ep. 3)
 Denis Lill as Charles Vaughan (ep. 4)
 Annie Hayes as Loraine (ep. 4)
 Yvonne Bonnamy as Isla (ep. 4)
 Keith Jayne as Mick (ep. 4)
 June Bolton as Tessa (ep. 4)
 Maureen Nelson as Woman (ep. 4)
 Peter Miles as Lincoln (ep. 5)
 Frederick Hall as Jack (ep. 5)
 Nickolas Grace as Matthew (ep. 5)
 Kenneth Caswell as Robert (ep. 5)
 Peter Jeffrey as Knox (ep. 6)
 Dennis Chinnery as John Carroll (ep. 6)
 David G. Marsh as Bates (ep. 6)
 Michael Jamieson as Ken (ep. 6)
 Robert Oates as Harris (ep. 6)
 Susanna East as Betty (ep. 6)
 Roger Elliott as Sentry (ep. 6)
 Glyn Owen as Bernard Huxley (ep. 10)
 Caroline Burt as Laura Foster (ep. 10)
 Denis Lawson as Norman (ep. 10)
 James Hayes as Phil (ep. 10)
 Robert Tayman as Donnie (ep. 11)
 Matthew Long as Robert Lawson (ep. 12)
 Murray Hayne as Jim Buckmaster (ep. 12)
 Paul Chapman as Thorpe (ep. 12)
 Annie Irving as Ruth Anderson (ep. 13)
 Harry Markham as Burton (ep. 13)

Episodes

Series 2 (1976)
Having received word that her son is still alive, Abby has left the Grange to resume her search. Meanwhile, the community is devastated by a fire that kills many, including Emma, Charmian and Vic. The survivors join another community, Whitecross, run by Charles Vaughan, and become once more focused on the everyday practicalities of post-Death life. New major characters comprising the Whitecross band are Charles' partner Pet Simpson, travelling doctor Ruth Anderson and farmyard labourer Hubert Goss. Frequent visitors to Whitecross, both friendly and hostile, act as catalysts for various dramatic situations. Finally, the arrival of Norwegian survivors brings the possibility of re-establishing worldwide contact and technology. To achieve this, Greg departs Whitecross in a hot air balloon bound for Norway.

Regular cast

 Ian McCulloch as Greg Preston (eps. 1-8, 10-13)
 Denis Lill as Charles Vaughan (eps. 1-13)
 Lucy Fleming as Jenny Richards (eps. 1-3, 5, 7-8, 11-13)
 Celia Gregory as Ruth Anderson (eps. 1-6, 8, 10-13)
 Lorna Lewis as Pet Simpson (eps. 1-2, 5-13)
 John Abineri as Hubert Goss (eps. 1, 5-8, 11-13)
 Michael Gover as Arthur Russell (eps. 1-2, 5, 7-8, 11)
 Tanya Ronder as Lizzie Willoughby (eps. 1-2, 5-8, 10-13)
 Stephen Dudley as John Millon (eps. 1-2, 5-8, 10-13)
 Gordon Salkilld as Jack Wood (eps. 2, 5-6, 8, 11, 13)
 Chris Tranchell as Paul Pitman (eps. 1-2)
 Stephen Tate as Alan (eps. 8, 11-13)
 Heather Wright as Melanie (eps. 11-13)
 Roy Herrick as Lewis Fearns (eps. 8, 10)
 Delia Paton as Mina (eps. 6, 10)
 June Page as Sally (eps. 11-13)
 Gigi Gatti as Daniella (eps. 7-8, 12)
 Peter Duncan as Dave (eps. 11-13)
 Roger Monk as Pete (eps. 11-13)

Guest cast

 Terry Denton as Vic Thatcher (ep. 1 – uncredited)
 Coral Atkins as Penny (eps. 3-4)
 Nadim Sawalha as Amul (eps. 3-4)
 David Troughton as Stan (ep. 3)
 Patrick Holt as Doctor (eps. 3-4)
 Lennox Milne as Nessie (eps. 3-4)
 Sydney Tafler as Manny (eps. 3-4)
 Roger Lloyd-Pack as Wally (eps. 3-4)
 Wendy Williams as Barbara (eps. 3-4)
 Lloyd McGuire as George (eps. 3-4)
 Paula Williams as Maisie (ep. 3)
 David Pike as Mac (ep. 3 – uncredited)
 John Line as Alistair McFadden (ep. 5)
 Catherine Finn as Peggy (ep. 6)
 Amanda Humby as Betty (ep. 7 – uncredited)
 Andy Bradford as Sniper (ep. 7)
 William Wilde as Boult (ep. 7)
 Vivienne Burgess as Mrs. McGregor (ep. 7)
 Paul Grist as Morris (ep. 7)
 Emrys Leyshon as Roberts (ep. 7)
 Julie Peasgood as Judy (ep. 8)
 Martin Neil as Philip (ep. 8)
 Philip Madoc as Max Kershaw (ep. 9)
 Clare Kelly as Joy Dunn (ep. 9)
 James Cosmo as Lenny Carter (ep. 9)
 David Goodland as Sammy Waters (ep. 9)
 David Neilson as Mike (ep. 9)
 Elizabeth Cassidy as Susan (ep. 9)
 David Sibley as Kim (ep. 9)
 Vanessa Millard as Nancy (ep. 9)
 Patrick Troughton as John Millen (ep. 10)
 Kevin McNally as Jeff Kane (ep. 10)
 Brian Grellis as Les Grice (ep. 10)
 Ian Hastings as Mark Carter (ep. 11)
 Linda Robson as Barbara (ep. 12)
 Nula Conwell as Ann (ep. 12)
 Sally Osborne as Agnes Carlsson (ep. 13)
 Dan Meaden as Seth (ep. 13)
 Diggory Laycock as Baby Paul (uncredited)

Episodes

Series 3 (1977)
Having received word that Greg has returned to England from Norway and is injured, Charles and Jenny set out on horseback to find him. Warned by Jack that Charles and Jenny should turn back as they're heading into danger, Hubert sets out on horseback after Charles and Jenny. The trio's journey will take them right across what is left of the United Kingdom as their search leads them to various dead ends. However, they meet a broad spectrum of other survivors along the way, and the series continues to explore alternative reactions to the Death and what it takes to survive. The third series juxtaposes the personal story arc of the search for Greg with a wider narrative of society appearing to re-establish itself, with federated communities, market bartering and rudimentary railway travel, based on using the steam locomotives preserved on heritage railways. This culminates in the tentative return of law and order, and the quest to restore power through hydroelectricity.

Regular cast

 Denis Lill as Charles Vaughan (eps. 1, 3-9, 11-12)
 Lucy Fleming as Jenny Richards (eps. 1-3, 5-9, 11-12)
 John Abineri as Hubert Goss (eps. 1, 3, 5-9, 11-12)
 Ian McCulloch as Greg Preston (eps. 2, 10)
 Anna Pitt as Agnes Carlsson (eps. 2-3, 5, 10-11)
 Lorna Lewis as Pet Simpson (eps. 1, 6-7, 10)
 Gordon Salkilld as Jack Wood (eps. 1, 6, 10)
 Edward Underdown as Frank Garner (eps. 7-9)
 William Dysart as Alec Campbell (eps. 8-9, 11-12)
 Stephen Dudley as John Millon (eps. 1, 6, 10)
 Angie Stevens as Lizzie Willoughby (eps. 1, 6, 10)
 Robert Gillespie as Sam Mead (eps. 9, 11-12)
 Barbara Lott as Edith Walter (eps. 3, 5)
 Eric Deacon as Steve Walter (eps. 3, 5)
 Keith Varnier as Owen Walter (eps. 3, 5)
 Cheryl Hall as Mavis (eps. 3, 5)

Guest cast

 Dan Meaden as Seth (ep. 1)
 June Brown as Susan (ep. 1)
 Michael Hawkins as Colonel Clifford (ep. 1)
 Anthony Jacobs as Geert Miedel (ep. 1)
 John Rolfe as Summers (ep. 1)
 David Freedman as Roberts (ep. 1)
 Sylvia Coleridge as Mrs. Butterworth (ep. 2)
 Joseph McKenna as Eagle (ep. 2)
 Sean Caffrey as Millar (ep. 2)
 Prentis Hancock as McIntosh (ep. 2)
 John Barrard as Mr. Oliver (ep. 2)
 Keith Collins as Bernie (ep. 2)
 Christopher Huxtable as Philip (ep. 2)
 Richard Beaumont as Cliff (ep. 2)
 Johanna Sheffield as Libbie (ep. 2)
 Nicola Glickman as Annie (ep. 2)
 Brian Blessed as Brod (ep. 3)
 Morris Perry as Richard Fenton (ep. 4)
 Bernard Kay as Sanders (ep. 4)
 Ralph Arliss as Jim (ep. 4)
 Max Faulkner as Phil (ep. 4)
 Heather Canning as Ellen (ep. 4)
 Stephen Bill as Ron (ep. 4)
 Eric Francis as Engine Driver (ep. 4)
 Robert Pugh as Terry the Fireman (ep. 4)
 Jane Shaw as Young Girl (ep. 4)
 Alfreda Atkinson as Alfreda (ep. 4 – uncredited)
 John Ronane as Bill Sheridan (ep. 5)
 Hazel McBride as Alice (ep. 5)
 Harry Jones as Elphick (ep. 5)
 Rosalind Elliot as Susan (ep. 5)
 John Ruddock as Bagley (ep. 5)
 Kelly Varney as Tom Walter (ep. 5 – uncredited)
 John Lee as Philip Hurst (ep. 6)
 Jean Gilpin as Janet Millon (ep. 6)
 George Waring as Walter (ep. 6)
 Alan Halley as Henry (ep. 7)
 Paul Seed as Grant (ep. 7)
 Nicolette Roeg as Blossom (ep. 7)
 Heather Emmanuel as Rutna (ep. 7)
 Norman Robbins as Bentley (ep. 7)
 Brian Conley as Michael (ep. 7)
 John Grieve as McLain (ep. 7)
 Derek Martin as Cyril (ep. 7)
 Harry Fielder as Larry (ep. 7 – uncredited)
 Gabrielle Hamilton as Letty (ep. 8)
 John Bennett as Jim (“Queenie”) (ep. 8)
 Linda Polan as Bet (ep. 8)
 John White as Vic (ep. 8)
 Bryan Pringle as Leonard Woollen (ep. 9)
 Frances Tomelty as Mary-Jean Mead (ep. 9)
 Joe Sumner as Baby (ep. 9)
 Peggy Ann Wood as Mrs. Jay (ep. 9)
 Terence Davies as Harper (ep. 9)
 Martyn Whitby as Grant (ep. 9)
 Clifton Jones as Dr. Stephen Adams (ep. 10)
 George Mallaby as Mason (ep. 10)
 Roy Boyd as Tilley (ep. 10)
 Jon Glover as Dave (ep. 10)
 Richard Cornish as Chris (ep. 10)
 Paul Humpoletz as Powell (ep. 10)
 David Cook as Irvine (ep. 10)
 Roy Marsden as The Captain (ep. 11)
 Frank Vincent as Mitch (ep. 11)
 Gabrielle Daye as Mrs. Hicks (ep. 11)
 John Comer as Les Norton (ep. 11)
 Sean Mathias as Mike (ep. 11)
 Ray Mort as Joe Briggs (ep. 11)
 Denis Holmes as Robert Banks (ep. 11)
 Constance Reason as Alice Briggs (ep. 11 – uncredited)
 Iain Cuthbertson as McAlister (ep. 12)
 William Armour as Davey (ep. 12)
 Brian Carey as Hamish (ep. 12)
 Barry Stokes as Tom Walter (ep. 12)
 Dorothy Dean as Mrs. Crombie (ep. 12)
 Ray Jeffries as Rob (ep. 12)
 Diggory Laycock as Baby Paul (uncredited)

Episodes

Audio drama episodes

Series 1 (2014)
"Revelation" and "Exodus" depict events happening in parallel with the early episodes of the first TV series, as the Death first takes hold and wipes out much of the UK's population. "Judges" and "Esther" take place after the Grange's cellar storeroom is flooded ("Something of Value").

Series 2 (2015)

Series 3 (2015)
Events in this box-set take place between Series 1 and Series 2 of the TV series.

Events in this box-set take place between Series 1 and Series 2 of the TV series.

Series 4 (2016)
Events in this box-set take place between the episodes of the second TV series.

Series 5 (2016)
Events in this box-set happen between the episodes of the second TV series.

Series 6 (2017)
Events in this box-set happen between the second and third TV series and in parallel with early episodes of the third.

Series 7 (2017)
Events in this box-set happen after the end of the third TV series.

Series 8 (2018)
Events in this box-set happen after the end of the third TV series.

Series 9 (2019)

Series 10: New Dawn (2021–22)

Books
Two novels related to series one have been published: 
 An adaptation of certain of his own series one episodes, with a radically different ending
 A direct sequel to Nation's book; it bears no relation to events in series two and three

Two factual books about the series have been published:

Home releases

Each of the three series of Survivors were originally released on DVD annually from 2003–2005 by DD Home Entertainment. Each series set included a colour booklet written and researched by Survivors fan Andy Priestner chronicling the making of each series, plus the following extra features:

On 24 November 2008, the BBC company 2 Entertain released all three series of Survivors together in a boxset, with the BBC4 documentary The Cult of Survivors from 2006 included as an extra. Also included on the 2008 DVD boxset were English language subtitles for the hard-of-hearing, which weren't included on previous DVD releases. However, the audio commentaries, on-camera interviews, Denis Lill's photo collection and New World Rising documentary from previous DVD releases were not included on the 2008 DVD boxset.

See also
Jeremiah (TV series), another post-plague series, set 15 years after a plague killed off the adults, with similarities to both The Tribe and Survivors
The Tribe, a post-plague series focusing on teenagers, right after a plague kills off all adults
Jericho (2006 TV series), a post-nuclear holocaust series
The Changes (TV series), a series set in a Britain that is suddenly plunged into a pre-industrial age
The Last Train (TV series), a series following a group of train passengers who survive an apocalyptic meteor strike
The Stand (1994 miniseries), a post-plague television series set in the United States, based on Stephen King's 1978 novel of the same name

References

External links

British Film Institute Screen Online

 The Cult of... Survivors
Survivors TV Series
Survivors: A World Away
Survivors ranked from worst to best

BBC television dramas
British science fiction television shows
Post-apocalyptic television series
1970s British drama television series
1975 British television series debuts
1977 British television series endings
English-language television shows
Television series created by Terry Nation
1970s British science fiction television series
Television series about viral outbreaks
Television shows set in Wales
Television shows set in Herefordshire